Amphidromus chloris is a species of air-breathing land snail, a terrestrial pulmonate gastropod mollusk in the family Camaenidae.

This species can be found in the Philippines.

References

chloris
Gastropods described in 1848